South East Cornwall is a constituency represented in the House of Commons of the UK Parliament since 2010 by Sheryll Murray, a Conservative.

Boundaries 

1983–2010: The District of Caradon, the Borough of Restormel wards of Fowey, Lostwithiel, St Blaise, and Tywardreath, and the District of North Cornwall ward of Stoke Climsland.

2010–present: The District of Caradon, and the Borough of Restormel ward of Lostwithiel.

History
The predecessor county division, Bodmin, serving the area from 1885 until 1983 had (during those 98 years) 15 members (two of whom had broken terms of office serving the area), seeing twelve shifts of preference between the Liberal, Liberal Unionist and Conservative parties, spread quite broadly throughout that period.  Consistent with this, since 1983 the preference for an MP has alternated between Liberal Democrats and Conservatives.

The current constituency territory contains the location of several former borough constituencies which were abolished as 'rotten boroughs' by the Great Reform Act, 1832:

Callington
East Looe
Fowey
Lostwithiel
Saltash
St Germans
West Looe and Polperro

Constituency profile

The villages and towns in the South East of Cornwall often serve as a commuter base to the city of Plymouth, over the border in Devon.

Workless claimants were in November 2012 significantly lower than the national average of 3.8%, at 2.5% of the population based on a statistical compilation by The Guardian.

Members of Parliament

Elections

Elections in the 2010s

Elections in the 2000s

Elections in the 1990s

Elections in the 1980s

See also 

 List of parliamentary constituencies in Cornwall
 Forgotten Corner of Cornwall
 Wivelshire

Notes

References

Constituencies of the Parliament of the United Kingdom established in 1983
Parliamentary constituencies in Cornwall